El Bagre Airport or El Tomin Airport  is an airport serving El Bagre, a municipality of the Antioquia Department in Colombia.

The runway length does not include a  grass overrun on the north end.

See also

Transport in Colombia
List of airports in Colombia

References

External links 
OpenStreetMap - El Bagre
OurAirports - El Bagre
SkyVector - El Bagre
FallingRain - El Bagre Airport

Airports in Colombia
Buildings and structures in Antioquia Department